PP Motorsport are a professional motor racing team based in Lincoln, United Kingdom. They currently compete in UK Clio Cup with driver Anton Spires.

History 
Team owner, John Creasey, runs an automotive body and paint shop, Paint Perfect, based in Lincoln. With a long running interest in motor sport and an increasing number of clients bringing racing cars for body repairs a half finished Peugeot 106 GTi track car was purchased off eBay to be a company project in 2012. The car was developed by staff during evenings and run at local track days at the weekends. By the winter of 2013 the car had become a very reliable, capable track car and John started to research race series in which the Peugeot would be eligible. By April 2014 the decision had been made to purchase a new vehicle to purpose built for entry into the Michelin Clio Cup Series. The Peugeot was sold to a track day organizer and is currently available for rental.

2014 Michelin Clio Cup Series 
The team watched the opening rounds of the season from the stands at Rockingham. The following week an accident damaged Renault Clio 197 F1 arrived at the workshop and working evenings for the next seven weeks was repaired and build to Road Series specification. John and the team made their debut in May at Oulton Park.

It was a difficult first year for the rookie team with heavy damage sustained at Donington, but good performances at Brands Hatch and Snetterton  Limping the car home with a damaged track rod at Croft gave Creasey enough points to claim the Road Sport title. Westbourne Motorsport's Anton Spires claimed the overall Road Series title at the previous meeting at Snetterton.

2015 Michelin Clio Cup Series 
John once again entered the Road Series in 2015 with the season highlight coming in the form of a double pole and podium finish at Thruxton. 

Reigning Road Series Champion Anton Spires was signed as driver coach to the team  and he was entered into the Race Series for the final two meetings of the year. After a spectacular battle with James Dorlin, Spires just missed out on a podium finish on his debut weekend at Oulton Park.

2016 UK Clio Cup 
In the winter of 2015 PP Motorsport decided it would graduate to UK Clio Cup a full year ahead of the five year business plan. Anton Spires will resume driving duties whilst John Creasey will take a year out of racing to concentrate his energy on the management of the team. For the season the team will be assisted by Westbourne Motorsport who have a planned UK Clio Cup return for 2017.

References

British auto racing teams